Saracino is an Italian surname. Notable people with the surname include:

Antonio Pio Saracino (born 1976), Italian architect and designer
Bernardo Saracino, American actor
Janine Tagliante-Saracino, Ivorian diplomat

Italian-language surnames